British Chinese cuisine is a style of Chinese cuisine developed by British Chinese in the United Kingdom, typically adapted to British tastes but increasingly inspired by authentic Cantonese dishes. It is considered a major part of British cuisine.

History 

In the early 1880s, Chinese food items and eating houses appeared in London and Liverpool, mainly visited by Chinese seamen and students.

In 1884, Chinese food was made available as part of a 'restaurant' in the International Health Exhibition in South Kensington, London.

In 1907 or 1908, the first recorded Chinese restaurant was opened in London. The rise in the number of Chinese restaurants in the UK only began after the Second World War, and has been attributed to returning service personnel from Hong Kong. The restaurants were operated by Hong Kongers who moved to the UK.

In 2011, the Ming-Ai (London) Institute launched the British Chinese Food Culture project with a grant from the Heritage Lottery Fund, aimed at exploring and tracking the changes in Chinese food throughout its history in the United Kingdom.

In 2020, the coronavirus pandemic negatively impacted many Chinese restaurants in the UK, with a number of restaurants in London's Chinatown in particular facing financial difficulty as a result of prejudice against Chinese takeaways, based on fears described by the BBC as "unfounded".

Cuisine and regional variations 

Chinese food is considered a major part of British cuisine. In 2017, over 80% of Londoners reported having been to a Chinese takeaway.

Some Chinese takeaway restaurants in Britain have developed original recipes such as jar jow, a stir-fried dish of sliced char siu, bamboo shoots, onions and green pepper seasoned with chilli powder and tomato paste. By the late 2010s, the popularity of old fashioned dishes like jar jow had faded in favour of American-style Chinese dishes such as chop suey and Americanised chow mein in Chinese takeaways, whereas many other restaurants throughout Britain increasingly offer authentic Chinese dishes.

See also 
 Chicken balls
 Fusion cuisine
 American Chinese cuisine
 Canadian Chinese cuisine
 Australian Chinese cuisine

References 

British fusion cuisine
Chinese fusion cuisine